Tuva or Tyva, officially the Republic of Tuva, is a republic of Russia. Tuva lies at the geographical center of Asia, in southern Siberia. The republic borders the Altai Republic, Khakassia, Krasnoyarsk Krai, Irkutsk Oblast, and Buryatia in Russia, and shares an international border with Mongolia to the south. Tuva has a population of 336,651 (2021 census). Its capital is the city of Kyzyl.

Historically part of Outer Mongolia as Tannu Uriankhai during the Qing dynasty, the last imperial dynasty of China, Tuva broke away in 1911 as the Uryankhay Republic following the Xinhai Revolution, which created the Republic of China. It became a Russian protectorate in 1914 and was replaced by the nominally independent Tuvan People's Republic in 1921 (known officially as Tannu Tuva until 1926), recognized only by its neighbors the Soviet Union and Mongolia, before being annexed into the former in 1944. A majority of the population are ethnic Tuvans who speak Tuvan as their native tongue, while Russian is spoken natively by the Russian minority; both are official and widely understood in the republic. The Great Khural is the regional parliament of Tuva.

History

The territory of Tuva has been controlled by the Xiongnu Empire (209 BC93 AD) and the Xianbei state (93–234), Rouran Khaganate (330–555), Tang Dynasty (647–682), Yenisei Kyrgyz Khaganate (7th13th century), Mongol Empire (1206–1271), Yuan dynasty (1271–1368), Northern Yuan dynasty (1368–1691), Khotgoid Khanate and Zunghar Khanate (1634–1758). Medieval Mongol tribes, including Oirats and Tumeds, inhabited areas which are now part of the Tuvan Republic.

From 1758 to 1911, Tuva was part of China's Qing dynasty and administered by Outer Mongolia. During the Xinhai Revolution in China, Tsarist Russia formed a separatist movement among the Tuvans while there were also pro-independence and pro-Mongol groups. Tsar Nicholas II agreed to the third petition by Tuva's leadership in 1912, establishing a protectorate over the then-independent state. Some Russians, such as merchants, travellers, and explorers, had already settled in Tuva at that time. Tuva became nominally independent as the Uryankhay Republic before being turned into a Russian protectorate as Uryankhay Krai under Tsar Nicholas II, on 17 April 1914.

A Tuvan capital was established, called Belotsarsk (Белоца́рск; literally, "(Town) of the White Tsar"). Meanwhile, in 1911, Mongolia became independent, though under Russian protection. Following the Russian Revolution of 1917 that ended the imperial autocracy, most of Tuva was occupied from 5 July 1918 to 15 July 1919 by Alexander Kolchak's White Russian troops. Pyotr Ivanovich Turchaninov was named governor of the territory. In the autumn of 1918, the southwestern part was occupied by Chinese troops and the southern part by Mongol troops led by Khatanbaatar Magsarjav.

From July 1919 to February 1920, the communist Red Army controlled Tuva but from 19 February 1920 to June 1921 it was occupied by China (governor was Yan Shichao [traditional, Wade–Giles transliteration: Yan Shi-ch'ao]). On 14 August 1921, the Bolsheviks established the Tuvan People's Republic, popularly called Tannu-Tuva. In 1926, the capital (Belotsarsk; Khem-Beldyr since 1918) was renamed Kyzyl, meaning "red". The Tuvan People's Republic was de jure an independent state between the World Wars. The state's ruler, Chairman Donduk Kuular, sought to strengthen ties with Mongolia and establish Buddhism as the state religion. This unsettled the Soviet Union, which orchestrated a coup carried out in 1929 by five young Tuvan graduates of Moscow's Communist University of the Toilers of the East.

In 1930, the pro-Soviet regime discarded the state's Mongol script in favor of a Latin alphabet designed for Tuva by Russian linguists. In 1943, Cyrillic script replaced Latin. Under the leadership of Party Secretary Salchak Toka, ethnic Russians were granted full citizenship rights and Buddhist and Mongol influences on the Tuvan state and society were systematically curtailed.

Tuva was annexed by the Soviet Union in 1944, with the approval of Tuva's Little Khural (parliament), but without a referendum on the issue. It became the Tuvan Autonomous Oblast, within the Russian Soviet Federative Socialist Republic, after the Soviet victory in World War II. Salchak Toka, leader of the Tuvan People's Revolutionary Party, was given the title of First Secretary of the Tuvan Communist Party and became the de facto ruler of Tuva until his death in 1973. The territory became the Tuvan Autonomous Soviet Socialist Republic on 10 October 1961.

In February 1990, the Tuvan Democratic Movement was founded by Kaadyr-ool Bicheldei, a philologist at the Kyzyl State Pedagogical Institute. The party aimed to provide jobs and housing (both in short supply), and improve the status of the Tuvan language and culture. Later in the year, there was a wave of attacks against Tuva's sizeable Russian community, including sniper attacks on trucks, and attacks on outlying settlements, with 168 murdered. Russian troops were eventually called in. Many Russians moved out of the republic during this period. Tuva has remained remote and difficult to access.

Tuva was a signatory to the 31 March 1992 treaty that created the Russian Federation. On 22 October 1993, a new constitution was drawn up for the republic, creating a 32-member parliament (Supreme Khural) and a Grand Khural, which deals with local legislation. The constitution was approved by 53.9% (62.2% according to another source) of Tuvans in a referendum on 12 December 1993. At the same time, the official name was changed from Tuva (Тува) to Tyva (Тыва).

Soldiers from Tuva participate in the 2022 Russian invasion of Ukraine. Women protested against mobilization in Kyzyl, 20 of them were arrested.

Geography

The Tyva Republic is situated in the far south of Siberia. Its capital city is Kyzyl, located near the geographic "center of Asia". The eastern part of the republic is forested and elevated, while the western part is a drier lowland.
Borders:
internal: Khakassia (NW/N), Krasnoyarsk Krai (N), Irkutsk Oblast (N/NE), Buryatia (E), Altai Republic (SW/W)
international: Mongolia (Bayan-Ölgii Province, Khövsgöl Province, Uvs Province and Zavkhan Province) (S)
Highest point: Mount Mongun-Tayga, 
Maximum N–S distance: 
Maximum E–W distance: over 
Area:

Rivers
There are over 8,000 rivers in the Tyvan Republic, including the upper course of the Yenisei River, the fifth longest river in the world. Most of the republic's rivers are Yenisei tributaries. There are also numerous mineral springs in the area.

Major rivers include:
 Yenisei River (also called Ulug-Khem)
 Kantegir River
 Khemchik River
 Maly Yenisei River (also called Ka-Khem or Kaa-Khem)
 Upper Yenisei River (also called Biy-Khem or Bii-Khem)

Lakes

There are numerous lakes in Tuva, many of which are glacial and salt lakes, including Todzha Lake, a.k.a. Azas Lake (100 km2) – the largest in the republic, and Uvs Lake (shared with Mongolia and a World Heritage Site).

Mountains

The Tyva Republic is made up of a mountain basin, about 600 m high, encircled by the Sayan and Tannu-Ola mountain ranges. Mountains and hills cover over 80% of its territory. Mongun-Tayga ("Silver Mountain", 3,970 m) is the highest point in the republic and is named after its glacier.

Administrative divisions

Demographics
Population:

Vital statistics
Source: Russian Federal State Statistics Service 

Average life expectancy: Tuva: 56.5 (average male and female, UNDP data); Russia: (UN data) Male 59 (world rank 166); Female 73 (127)

Ethnic groups
According to the 2021 Census, Tuvans make up 88.7% of the  population. Other groups include Russians (10.1%), and a host of smaller groups, each accounting for less than 0.5% of the total population.

As can be seen above, during the period 1959–2010 there has been more than a doubling of ethnic Tuvans. The Russian population growth slowed by the 1980s and decreased by 50% since 1989. The official languages are Tuvan (Turkic) and Russian (Slavic).

Outside Kyzyl, settlements have few if any Russian inhabitants and, in general, Tuvans use their original language as their first language. However, there is a small population of Old Believers in the Republic scattered in some of the most isolated areas. Before Soviet rule, there were a number of large ethnic Russian Old Believer villages, but as the atheist ideology crept in, the believers moved deeper and deeper into the taiga in order to avoid contact with outsiders. Major Old Believer villages are Erzhei, Uzhep, Unzhei, Zhivei and Bolee Malkiye (all in the Kaa-Khemsky District). Smaller ultra-Orthodox settlements are found further upstream.

Ethnic Russians make up 34.3% of the population (as of 2010 Census) in Kaa-Khemsky District, one of the most remote regions in Tuva. The population is mostly Old Believers. Russians account for 29.1% of the population in Piy-Khemsky and 28.4% in Kyzyl.

Religion

Two religions are widespread among the Tuvan people: Tibetan Buddhism and shamanism. Tibetan Buddhism's present-day spiritual leader is Tenzin Gyatso, the fourteenth Dalai Lama. In September 1992, Tenzin Gyatso visited Tuva for three days. On September 20, he blessed and consecrated the yellow-blue-white flag of Tuva, which had been officially adopted three days before.

The Tuvan people – along with the Yellow Uyghurs in China – are one of the only two Turkic groups who are primarily adherents to Tibetan Buddhism, which coexists with native shamanistic traditions.

Tuvans were first exposed to Buddhism during the 13th and 14th centuries, when Tuva entered into the composition of the Mongol Empire. The earliest Buddhist temples uncovered by archaeologists in the territory of Tuva date to the 13th and 14th centuries. During the 16th and 17th centuries, Tibetan Buddhism gained popularity in Tuva. An increasing number of new and restored temples are coming into use, and there has been an upward trend in the number of novices being trained as monks and lamas in recent years. Religious practice declined under the restrictive policies of the Soviet period, but is now flourishing.

According to a 2012 survey, 61.8% of the population of Tuva adheres to Buddhism, 8% to Tengrism or Tuvan shamanism, 1.5% to the Russian Orthodox Church, the Old Believers or other forms of Christianity, 1% to Protestantism. In addition, 7.7% follow other religions or did not give an answer to the survey. 8% of the population declares to be "spiritual but not religious" and 12% to be atheist.

Politics

The present flag of Tuva – yellow for prosperity, blue for courage and strength, white for purity – was adopted on 17 September 1992. The Republic's Constitution was adopted on 23 October 1993.

The head of Tuva is the chairman of the government and serves a five-year term which can be renewed. The first Chairman of the Government was Sherig-ool Oorzhak. On 3 April 2007, Russian president Vladimir Putin nominated Sholban Kara-ool, 40, a former champion wrestler, as the Chairman of the Government of Tuva. Kara-ool's candidacy was approved by the Khural on 9 April 2007. Kara-ool served from 2007 until 2021. The third and current Tuvan head of government is Vladislav Khovalyg.

Tuva's legislature, the Great Khural, has 32 seats as of 2023; each deputy is elected to serve a five-year term.

Economy

Mining
Ak-Sugskoye mine (copper reserve)

Transportation
Tuva does not have a railway, although famous postage stamps in the 1930s, designed in Moscow during the time of Tuvan independence, mistakenly depict locomotives as demonstrating Soviet-inspired progress there.
 The Kuragino–Kyzyl railway line was scheduled to be completed in 2026.

Tuva is served by Kyzyl Airport.

Culture

Traditionally, the Tuvan people are a Central Asian yurt-dwelling nomadic culture, with distinctive traditions in music, cuisine, and folk art. Tuvan music features Tuvan throat singing (khoomei), in which the singer sings a fundamental tone and an overtone simultaneously. This type of singing can be heard during performances by the Tuvan National Orchestra, at events such as the 'International Khoomei Day' held at the National Tuvinian Theatre in Kyzyl.

The Tuvan craft tradition includes carving the soft stone, agalmatolite. A frequent motif is hand-held-sized animals, such as horses.

Important archaeological excavations in Tuva include Arzhaan-1 and Tunnug 1, dating to the ninth century BC. and Arzhaan-2, where Scythian animal art in great variety, and over 9,000 decorative gold pieces were unearthed.
 A collection of gold jewelry from this site is on display at the National Museum Aldan-Maadyr in Kyzyl.

Festivals celebrating Tuvan traditions include the ecological film festival "The Living Path of Dersu", the Interregional Festival of National Cultures "Heart of Asia". It has become a tradition to hold the international festival of live music "Ustuu-Khuree", the International Symposium "Khoomei – the Phenomenon of the Culture of the Peoples of Central Asia", the Regional Competition-Festival of Performers on National Instruments "Dingildai", the International Felt Festival "Patterns of Life on Felt" Pop songs "Melodies of the Sayan Mountains".

Religion
Tuva is one of the few places in the world where the original form of shamanism is preserved as part of the traditional culture of Tuva. Shamanism presupposes the existence of good and evil spirits inhabiting mountains, forests and water, as well as the heavens and the underworld. The mediator between man and the spirits is the shaman. It is believed that with the help of spirits the shaman is able to cure patients and predict the future.

In Tuva, shamanism peacefully coexists with Buddhism. Buddhism is associated with many folk rituals, calendar holidays, and folk medicines in Tuva. Centers of Buddhism in Tuva are Khuree – temples, temple complexes; the temple complex Tsechenling in Kyzyl is the residence of Khambo Lama, head of Buddhism in Tuva. Treasures of the old Slavonic culture in the Asian Tuva saved along with the values of other peoples – children's folklore ensemble "Oktay" from the city of Kyzyl in the course several ethnographic expeditions in the old believers ' settlements were able to collect an extensive collection of samples of ancient singing art.

Music

Sports
Bandy, a sport similar to ice hockey, is played in Tuva. Mongolian-style wrestling is very popular, as are most martial arts. Horse riding related sports are also predominant in the area.

Miscellaneous 

 In the 1920s and 1930s, postage stamps from Tuva were issued. Many philatelists have been fascinated with Tuva because of these stamps. The stamps were issued mainly during the brief period of Tuvan independence and were not accepted by serious collectors until recently as they were thought to be produced in Moscow and not to represent a genuine postal service.
According to Ilya Zakharov of Moscow's Vavilov Institute of General Genetics, genetic evidence suggests that the modern Tuvan people are the closest genetic relatives to the native peoples of North and South America.
 Physicist Richard Feynman details in his autobiographical works that he became fascinated with Tuva as a child and was able to make limited contact with the country despite the constraints of the Soviet period. His unsuccessful attempts to visit were detailed in Tuva or Bust!
 The Sayan Mountains in Tuva were featured in Bear Grylls' Man vs Wild adventure TV show.

Notable people
 

 Kongar-ool Ondar (1962–2013), the Groovin' Tuvan, master throat singer and a member of the Great Khural of Tuva.
 Stepan Saryg-Ool (1908–1983), Soviet Tuvan poet, writer, folklore specialist, and politician
 Sergei Shoygu (born 1955), current Minister of Defence of the Russian Federation

See also
 List of Tuvans
 Music of Tuva
 Altai-Sayan region

Notes

References

Citations

Sources 

 DONAHOE, Brian "Hey, you! Get offa my taiga!": Comparing the sense of property rights among the Tofa and Tozhu-Tyva. Max Planck Institute for Social Anthropology working papers, nº 38. Halle/Saale: Max Planck Institute for Social Anthropology, Max-Planck-Gesellschaft, 2002; .

External links

 Official website of Tuva
 Website of Tuva 
 Tuva in Russia.Travel
 Friends of Tuva, Japan
More complete collection of Tuvan Stamps (1926–1943) 
TyvaWiki:Main Page

 
Russian-speaking countries and territories
States and territories established in 1992
1992 establishments in Russia
Observer members of the International Organization of Turkic Culture